The Ceylon National Congress (Sinhala: ලංකා ජාතික කොන්ග්‍රසය Lanka Jathika Kongrasaya) (CNC) was a Nationalist political party which was formed in Ceylon on 11 December 1919. It was founded after nationalism grew quite intensely in the early 20th century during the British Colonial rule in Ceylon. It was formed by members of the Ceylon National Association (founded in 1888) and the Ceylon Reform League (founded in 1917). The Ceylon National Congress played an instrumental role in the attainment of Sri Lanka's independence later in 1948. Sir Ponnambalam Arunachalam was the founding president of the party. In October 1920, Sir James Peiris was elected president, staunchly supported by F.R. Senanayake and D.S. Senanayake. Other former presidents include D. B. Jayatilaka, E. W. Perera, C. W. W. Kannangara, Patrick de Silva Kularatne, H. W. Amarasuriya, W. A. de Silva, George E. de Silva and Edwin Wijeyeratne. The Ceylon National Congress later paved the way for the formation of the United National Party. In 1943, D.S. Senanayake resigned from the Congress because he disagreed with its revised aim of achieving full freedom from the British Empire, preferring Dominion status.

See also
 Sri Lankan independence movement

References

1919 establishments in Ceylon
Defunct political parties in Sri Lanka
Political movements in Sri Lanka
Political parties established in 1919
Political parties in Sri Lanka
Sri Lankan independence movement